Outbreak is a medical thriller written by Robin Cook and published in 1987 which deals with an outbreak of the deadly Ebola virus in the United States.

Despite its name and similar storyline, the book is not related to the 1995 movie also called Outbreak. In 1995, the book was adapted into a film and released under the title "Robin Cook's Virus", later renamed Formula for Death, starring Nicollette Sheridan and William Devane.

Synopsis
When the director of a Los Angeles health maintenance clinic succumbs to an untreatable and virulently contagious virus, killing himself and seven of his patients, the Center for Disease Control in Atlanta responds immediately with a state of high alert. Unless the virus is isolated and checked, mankind may be facing its gravest medical crisis since the Black Death.

Assigned by the CDC to investigate the disease, Dr. Marissa Blumenthal is soon caught up in the ultimate nightmare. The California case is merely the first in a burgeoning series of outbreaks that occur in unrelated geographical areas but with puzzling commonalities: The locations are always health-care facilities, and the victims are only physicians and their patients. As her investigation takes increasingly bizarre turns, Marissa finds that behind the natural threat lurks a far more sinister possibility: sabotage.

Before she discovers the truth, Marissa must overcome her superiors' fury, her colleagues' doubts and the wrath of a powerful cabal, sworn to achieve its aims, no matter what the cost in human life, including Marissa's.

Publication information
 Cook, Robin. (1987) Outbreak.

References

External links
at robincook.com

1987 American novels
Macmillan Publishers books
Medical novels
Novels by Robin Cook
Novels about viral outbreaks
Ebola in popular culture